In Greek mythology, Lycus, also called Lycaon, was a son of Poseidon and Celaeno, one of the Pleiades. Together with his brother Eurypylus, they ruled over the Isles of the Fortunate which their father blessed.

References 

 Apollodorus, The Library with an English Translation by Sir James George Frazer, F.B.A., F.R.S. in 2 Volumes, Cambridge, MA, Harvard University Press; London, William Heinemann Ltd. 1921. Online version at the Perseus Digital Library. Greek text available from the same website.

Children of Poseidon
Demigods in classical mythology
Kings in Greek mythology